The National Bank of Commerce Building is a historic commercial building at 200 S. Pruett St. in downtown Paragould, Arkansas.  It is a two-story structure, built out of cut stone, with a center entrance recessed in a two-story opening with flanking Ionic columns.  This Classical Revival style building, probably the finest of its style in Greene County, and the least-altered bank building of the period in Paragould, was designed by the Memphis firm of Hankers and Cairns and was built in 1923.

The building was listed on the National Register of Historic Places in 1993.

See also
National Register of Historic Places listings in Greene County, Arkansas

References

Bank buildings on the National Register of Historic Places in Arkansas
Neoclassical architecture in Arkansas
Buildings and structures in Paragould, Arkansas
National Register of Historic Places in Greene County, Arkansas
Individually listed contributing properties to historic districts on the National Register in Arkansas